The 2016-2017 FC BATE Borisov season is the 20th consecutive season in the Belarusian Premier League. The team is not competing in Europe but are participating in the Belarusian Cup.

Squad

League table

References 

Belarusian football clubs 2016 season
2016
BATE Borisov
BATE Borisov